Chalaropsis is a monotypic genus of fungi within the Ceratocystidaceae family containing the sole species Chalaropsis populi.

References

External links 
 

Monotypic Sordariomycetes genera
Microascales